Charlie Wurz (born 2 December 2005) is an Austrian-British racing driver who most recently competed for Prema Racing in the Italian F4 Championship. He is the son of former Formula One driver Alexander Wurz.

Racing career

Karting 
Wurz competed in karting series across Europe since 2017. These included the Rotax Max Challenge, WSK events and FIA sanctioned karting series. During this time, Wurz was scouted to join the Ferrari Driver Academy.

Lower formulae

2021 
Wurz made his single-seater debut in 2021, competing at the Vallelunga round of the Italian F4 Championship as part of the Prema outfit and taking a win in the rookie class during Race 3. He would go on to compete in his home round at the Red Bull Ring, scoring points that elevated him to 20th in the standings. At the end of the year, Wurz took his first win in the category, taking victory at the F4 UAE Trophy Round held in support of the 2021 Abu Dhabi Grand Prix.

2022 
At the beginning of 2022, the Austrian competed in the F4 UAE Championship on a full-time basis in preparation for his European season. During the campaign, Wurz took a pair of victories, as well as eight further podiums, which enabled him to take the title in the final round.

For his main season, Wurz would remain with Prema for the entirety of the Italian F4 Championship, as well as taking part in the first half of the ADAC F4 series. In the latter, a third place at Spa-Francorchamps and a further pair of podiums at Zandvoort meant that the Austrian driver placed seventh in the standings, although his campaign in the former would bear more fruit. After a pair of points finishes at Imola, Wurz would take his first podium at Misano, having fought for victory with teammate Andrea Kimi Antonelli. More points came at Spa, before the Austrian tasted champagne at Vallelunga, scoring a pair of third places. At the penultimate round in Monza, Wurz would take pole for Race 1, which he managed to convert into his first victory in the series, whilst also scoring a podium in Race 2 during a weekend that the Austrian described as having been "fantastic". One more podium came during the season finale at Mugello, with Wurz finishing the season fourth in the standings.

Formula Regional 
At the start of 2023, Wurz took part in the Formula Regional Oceania Championship in New Zealand, driving for M2 Competition. He started the season in a strong manner, taking the championship lead during the first round with a pair of second-placed finishes in the main races. At the next event in Teretonga, the Austrian would extend his advantage at the top of the standings, winning races 1 and 3. After a lull at Manfeild, where Wurz finished no higher than fifth, he returned to the top step of the podium in the reverse grid race at Hampton Downs. As championship adversary Callum Hedge suffered from mechanical difficulties during the race, Wurz once again moved to the top of the standings. He won the feature race at Taupo while Hedge finished fourth, securing the series championship.

Wurz confirmed in January that he would be competing in the Formula Regional European Championship during the 2023 season.

Sportscar racing

Porsche Sprint Challenge 
In 2021, Wurz competed in two races of the Porsche Sprint Challenge Europe at the Hungaroring. He won one race, having secured a pole position and fastest lap in the same event. In the following race, Wurz finished on the podium in third position.

Wurz returned to the Porsche Sprint Challenge at the end of the year, this time racing in the Middle East. The Austrian managed to win three races, which placed him sixth in the GT4 standings despite missing the majority of the season.

Personal life 
Wurz's father is two-time Le Mans 24h winner and former Formula 1 driver Alexander Wurz. Wurz resides in Monte Carlo, but competes under the Austrian flag.

Karting record

Karting career summary

Racing record

Racing career summary 

† As Wurz was a guest driver, he was ineligible to score points.
* Season still in progress.

Complete Formula 4 UAE Championship results 
(key) (Races in bold indicate pole position) (Races in italics indicate fastest lap)

Complete ADAC Formula 4 Championship results 
(key) (Races in bold indicate pole position) (Races in italics indicate fastest lap)

*Season still in progress.

Complete Italian F4 Championship results 
(key) (Races in bold indicate pole position) (Races in italics indicate fastest lap)

Complete F4 Spanish Championship results 
(key) (Races in bold indicate pole position) (Races in italics indicate fastest lap)

Complete FIA Motorsport Games results

Complete Formula Regional Oceania Championship Results
(key) (Races in bold indicate pole position) (Races in italics indicate fastest lap)

Complete Formula Regional European Championship results 
(key) (Races in bold indicate pole position) (Races in italics indicate fastest lap)

References 

2005 births
Austrian racing drivers
Italian F4 Championship drivers
Living people
ADAC Formula 4 drivers
Prema Powerteam drivers
Karting World Championship drivers
Spanish F4 Championship drivers
Campos Racing drivers
FIA Motorsport Games drivers
Toyota Racing Series drivers
M2 Competition drivers
UAE F4 Championship drivers
Formula Regional European Championship drivers
ART Grand Prix drivers
People from Monte Carlo